Ancistrachne maidenii is a  grass (in the family Poaceae) endemic to New South Wales.

It is  a scrambling perennial grass with slender, rigid horizontal stems and branches which ascend.

The leaves have sheathes which are sparsely hairy and the ligule is fringed. When mature the spikelets (2.5–3 mm long ) fall entirely. The upper glume has five nerves. The lower lemma (similar to the upper glume), has seven nerves and is sterile. The fertile florets are elliptic to lanceolate, with nerves which are obscure. It flowers in summer, and grows on sandstone soils, north of Sydney.

The species was first described as Eriochloa maidenii by the botanist Arthur Hamilton in 1913, and in 1961 Joyce Vickery revised it to Ancistrachne maidenii. The specific epithet honours Joseph Maiden,

In New South Wales, this species is listed as "threatened".

References

External links 
 The Australasian Virtual Herbarium – Occurrence data
 PlantNET – Description

maidenii
Flora of New South Wales
Plants described in 1913